Honorific title may refer to:

Honorific, a form of addressing
Honorific titles in popular music
Title of honor, a title which is an award

See also
 Style (manner of address)